Colorful Dragon, is a maze game developed and published by Sachen for the Nintendo Entertainment System on 1989 in Asia. Bunch Games later licensed the game for distribution in North America for a 1990 release, and published it as Tagin' Dragon.

Sachen republished Colorful Dragon in the multi-game cartridge Super Cartridge Version 6: 6-in-1.

Gameplay
In the game, the player controls a European dragon, and attempts to bite the tails off other European dragons. The longer a dragon's tail, the more bites required to defeat it. There are 20 mazes.

Two players may play either competitively or cooperatively.

External links

1989 video games
Maze games
Nintendo Entertainment System games
Nintendo Entertainment System-only games
Unauthorized video games
Top-down video games
Video games about dragons
Video games developed in Taiwan
Bunch Games games